1992 in professional wrestling describes the year's events in the world of professional wrestling.

List of notable promotions 
These promotions held notable shows in 1992.

Calendar of notable shows

Notable events
 January 26 - The Tri-State Wrestling Alliance closes down due to financial problems.
 February 25 – Eastern Championship Wrestling is born in Philadelphia, Pennsylvania.
 May 15 – Antonio Peña and partners created the Mexican professional wrestling promotion Asistencia Asesoría y Administración (AAA), which would later grow to become one of the dominant promotions in Mexico.

Accomplishments and tournaments

ECW

WCW

WWF

Awards and honors

Pro Wrestling Illustrated

Wrestling Observer Newsletter

Title changes

ECW

NJPW

WCW

WWF

Births
 January 23 – Mark Andrews, British wrestler
 January 26 – Sasha Banks, American female wrestler
 February 14 – Diamante, Mexican luchador
 February 28 – El Hijo de Pirata Morgan, Mexican luchador
 March 3 – Mandy Leon, American wrestler
 March 14 - Shotzi Blackheart 
 April 18 - Jacob Fatu 
 May 19 - Reika Saiki 
 June 7 - Sara Lee (died in 2022) 
 June 24 - Kagetsu, Japanese wrestler 
 June 25 – Dinamic Black, Mexican luchador
 July 9 – Andrew Everett, American wrestler
 August 17 – Paige, British female wrestler
 August 20 – Oro Jr., Mexican luchador
September 14 - Penelope Ford 
September 23 – Angel Garza, Mexican wrestler
 October 9 – Jay White, New Zealand wrestler
 November 10
Marshall Von Erich, American wrestler
Peyton Royce, Australian female wrestler
 December 27 - Yuka Sakazaki 
 December 28 – Rachael Ellering, American female wrestler

Debuts
February 25 - Stevie Richards
March - Cibernético
March 12 - Triple H
July 1 - Edge
September 17 - Jun Akiyama
September 23 - John Bradshaw Layfield
October 15 - Matt Hardy

Retirements
 Ben Bassarab (1983–1992)
 Bill Kazmaier (1986-1992) 
 Billy Robinson (1955–1992)
 Dino Bravo (1970–1992)
 Don Owen (1930s–1992)
 Eric Embry (1977–October 30, 1992)
 Gene Kiniski (February 13, 1952 – February 25, 1992)
 George Wells (1973–1992) 
 Goldie Rogers (1972–1992)
 Ken Patera (1973–1992)
 Leo Burke (1966–1992)
 Nikita Koloff (1984–October 25, 1992)
 Randy Rose (1974–1992)
 Ray Stevens (1950–1992)
 Rockin' Robin (1987–1992)
 Vladimir Petrov (January 1987 – 1992)

Deaths
 February 7 – Buzz Sawyer, American wrestler (b. 1959)
 February 19 – Tojo Yamamoto, American wrestler and manager (b. 1927)
 April 20 – Jimmy Lennon, American wrestling announcer (b. 1913)
 May 11 – René Guajardo, Mexican luchador (b. 1933)
 May 12 – Lenny Montana, American wrestler and actor (b. 1926)
 June 26 – Buddy Rogers, American wrestler (b. 1921)
 July 1 – Uncle Elmer, American wrestler (b. 1937)
 July 14 – Danny McShain, American wrestler (b. 1912)
 September 13 - Dick Huffman, American wrestler (b. 1923) 
 September 24: 
Roy Heffernan, Australian wrestler (b. 1925)
Roy Shire, American wrestler (b. 1921) 
 October 31 – Joe Dusek, American wrestler (b. 1910)

See also
List of WCW pay-per-view events
List of WWF pay-per-view events
List of FMW supercards and pay-per-view events

References

 
professional wrestling